The 2010–11 NBL season is the 29th season for the Adelaide 36ers in the NBL.

Off-season

Additions

Subtractions

* Troy DeVries cut mid-season due to injury

The 36ers also managed to retain last year squad members: Darren Ng, Adam Ballinger, Nathan Herbert, Brad Hill, and Jacob Holmes.

Roster

TP – Training Player (only part of shadow training squad, does not play games).
C – Captain

Head Coach - Marty Clarke

Assistant Coach - Mark Radford

Regular season

Standings

Game log

|- style="background-color:#bbffbb;"
| 1
| 9 September
| Townsville
| W 87-86
|  
| 
| 
| Adelaide Arena  2,294
| 1–0
|- style="background-color:#ffcccc;"
| 2
| 10 September
| Townsville
| L 79-82
|  
| 
| 
| Mount Barker
| 1-1
|- style="background-color:#bbffbb;"
| 3
| 17 September
| Wollongong
| W 80-79
|  
| 
| 
| Whyalla Basketball Stadium
| 2-1
|- style="background-color:#bbffbb;"
| 4
| 19 September
| Wollongong
| W 89-84
|  
| 
| 
| STARplex Gawler, Adelaide
| 3-1

|- style="background-color:#bbffbb;"
| 1
| 17 October
| Perth
| W 74-69
| Troy DeVries (20) 
| Jacob Holmes (18)
| Troy DeVries (5)
| Adelaide Arena  5,021
| 1–0
|- style="background-color:#ffcccc;"
| 2
| 23 October
| @ Cairns
| L 74-95
| Adam Ballinger (16)
| Troy DeVries, Adam Ballinger (7)
| Rhys Carter (8)
| Cairns Convention Centre  4,250
| 1-1
|- style="background-color:#ffcccc;"
| 3
| 31 October
| Wollongong
| L 82-96
| Rhys Carter, Adam Ballinger Craig Winder (12)
| Jacob Holmes, Craig Winder (6)
| Troy DeVries (11)
| The Dome  4,519
| 1-2

|- style="background-color:#bbffbb;"
| 4
| 6 November
| Sydney
| W 87-75
| Troy DeVries (18)
| Jacob Holmes (10)
| Jacob Holmes, Rhys Carter (6)
| Adelaide Arena  4,620
| 2-2
|- style="background-color:#ffcccc;"
| 5
| 12 November
| New Zealand
| L 78-82
| Adam Ballinger (16)
| Jacob Holmes (7)
| Craig Winder (6)
| The Dome 5,430
| 2-3
|- style="background-color:#ffcccc;"
| 6
| 20 November
| @ Cairns
| L 71-87
| Adam Ballinger (17)
| Jacob Holmes, Daniel Johnson (7)
| Rhys Carter (3)
| Cairns Convention Centre  4,920
| 2-4
|- style="background-color:#ffcccc;"
| 7
| 21 November
| @ Townsville
| L 73-77
| Adam Ballinger (14)
| Adam Ballinger (8)
| Jacob Holmes (4)
| Townsville Entertainment Centre  4,021
| 2-5

|- style="background-color:#bbffbb;"
| 8
| 3 December
| Townsville
| W 92-79
| Adam Ballinger (18)
| Adam Ballinger (8)
| Rhys Carter (8)
| Adelaide Arena  4,595
| 3-5
|- style="background-color:#ffcccc;"
| 9
| 10 December
| @ Wollongong
| L 79-81
| Adam Ballinger (19)
| Jacob Holmes (8)
| Eddie Shannon (5)
| WIN Entertainment Centre  3,245
| 3-6
|- style="background-color:#"
| 10
| 17 December
| Sydney
| 
|  
| 
| 
| The Dome  
| 
|- style="background-color:#"
| 11
| 23 December
| Townsville
| 
|  
| 
| 
| The Dome  
| 
|- style="background-color:#"
| 12
| 31 December
| Wollongong
| 
|  
| 
| 
| The Dome 
| 
|-

Finals

Player statistics

Regular season

Finals

Awards

Player of the Week

Player of the Month

Coach of the Month

See also
2010-11 NBL season

References

External links

Adelaide
Adelaide 36ers seasons